Myaungmya District is a district of the Ayeyarwady Division in south western Myanmar. It consists of 5 cities. Myaungmya is the chief town of the district.

Myaungmya district was formed in 1893 out of a portion of Bassein district, and reconstituted until 1903. The district is a deltaic tract, bordering south on the sea and traversed by many tidal creeks. Rice cultivation and fishing occupy practically all the inhabitants of the district.

The district contains three townships: Myaungmya Township, Einme Township, and Wakema Township. In the Townships, there are 50 wards, 489 village groups and 2557 villages.

Districts of Myanmar
Ayeyarwady Region